City West station is one of four light rail stations planned in Eden Prairie, Minnesota on the Southwest LRT extension of the Green Line. The City West Station will be near the corporate campus for Optum, and the station is positioned west of U.S. Route 212 and south of Minnesota State Highway 62.

References

External links
City West Station Engineering Design

Metro Green Line (Minnesota) stations
Railway stations scheduled to open in 2025
Railway stations under construction in the United States